American Sausage Standoff (formerly titled Gutterbee) is a 2021 Danish comedy-drama film written and directed by Ulrich Thomsen and starring Antony Starr and Ewen Bremner.

Cast
Antony Starr as Mike Dankworth McCoid
Ewen Bremner as Edward Hofler
W. Earl Brown as Jimmy Jerry Lee Jones Jr.
Joshua Harto as Hank
Clark Middleton as Luke Kenneth Hosewall
Chance Kelly as Sheriff T.J. Brown

Release
In June 2021, it was announced that Samuel Goldwyn Films acquired U.S. distribution rights to the film.  It was released on August 27, 2021.

Reception
The film has a 36% rating on Rotten Tomatoes based on 11 reviews.

Glenn Kenny of The New York Times gave the film a negative review and wrote, "...the end product of this dismal film is mostly befuddlement."

Demetrios Matheou of Screen International also gave the film a negative review and wrote, "...its combination of extremely eccentric comedy and bigotry-themed drama would be challenging at the best of times; and Thomsen doesn’t exercise enough finesse or restraint to pull it off."

References

External links